Étang des Redouneilles des vaches is a lake in Ariège, France.

Redouneilles des vaches